Anne Elizabeth Monius (February 17, 1964 – August 3, 2019) was an American Indologist and religious scholar. She was a Professor of South Asian Religions at the Harvard Divinity School, best known for her analyses of literary culture to reconstruct the history of faiths in South India.

Life

Monius was born in New Hampshire to Felix and Eleanor Monius, who were farmers. Her grandfather was an immigrant to the US from Lithuania.

Monius attended Hollis Area High School in Hollis, New Hampshire, where she was valedictorian in 1982. She then went to Harvard University to study theoretical astrophysics. Inspired by a course on Indian civilisation by Diana L. Eck, she switched majors to South Asian religions. She obtained her undergraduate degree in 1986, and followed with master's and doctoral degrees (1997) from Harvard.

Monius was married to Wilson Manoharan.

She died on August 3, 2019.

Career
From 1997 to 2002, Monius taught in the department of religious studies at the University of Virginia. She joined the Harvard Divinity School in 2002, where she continued till her death. She was made a full professor in 2004.

From 2010, Monius was the editor of the American Academy of Religion's book series Religion in Translation, a continuation of the Texts and Translations series that she co-edited since 2004.

Research
Monius studied in Chennai for two years, researching two Buddhist texts in the Tamil language, the only ones that have survived to date. This formed the basis of her doctoral dissertation, which she expanded to her 2001 book, Imagining a Place for Buddhism: Literary Culture and Religious Community in Tamil-Speaking South India.

This well-received book sought to establish the cultural milieu of the Tamil country from the Manimekalai (thought to date from the 6th century) and the Virocoliyam (11th century). Monius suggested that it was possible to tease out their world even in the absence of contextual background in the form of archaeology or parallel developments in Southeast Asian Buddhism. Her reconstruction of the world of the former text, drawing parallels from the Jaina text Cilappatikaram, appeared however to conflict against it being a one-off, and has been criticised for ignoring the possibility that there was a thriving literary production that drew across a multitude of religious traditions. Indeed, Monius placed these texts within a pan-Buddhist sphere that worked across languages, establishing connections with Pali and Sanskrit literary productions.

In her studies of the South Indian bhakti tradition, Monius established that it was predominantly a Saivite movement than a Vaishnavite one. She showed that the Tamil litterateurs did not restrict themselves to their local geography but wished to expand the scope of the Tamil bhakti universe to northern India, including the Himalayas, which are considered to be Shiva's domains, albeit with an understanding that the essential core was a Tamil one.

Continuing with the theme of religious ecumenism, Monius discussed the presence of the Hindu god Krishna in two non-Hindu Tamil texts, the Buddhist Manimekalai and the Jaina Cilappatikaram, both mentioned above. Krishna's cosmic dance is described, as well as other figures from Krishna-lore (notably Balarama and Radha), but as these poems are associated with Hindu tradition, Monius' declaration of their non-Hinduness was questioned. On the other hand, linguistic styles enabled a kind of religious chauvinism, with the use of correct or pure or literary Tamil signifying the knowledge of a true God. In medieval Tamil society, predominantly Hindu, this distinction served to mark Jain and Buddhist poets as foreign.

Selected works

References

External links 
 

2019 deaths
Harvard University alumni
People from New Hampshire
1964 births
American Indologists
American historians of religion
Hindu studies scholars
Tamil–English translators
American people of Lithuanian descent
20th-century translators